Privy Councillor (tayniy sovetnik) was the civil position (class) in the Russian Empire, according to the Table of Ranks introduced by Peter the Great in 1722. Initially, it was a civil rank of 4th class, but from 1724 it was upgraded to the 3rd class. The rank was equal to those of Lieutenant-General in the Army and Vice-Admiral in the Navy. The rank holder should be addressed as Your Excellency (Vashe Prevoskhoditelstvo).

Overview
The name of the rank can be associated with the original meaning of the words "secret" and "trustworthy". Those awarded this rank occupied the highest public offices, such as Minister or Deputy Minister, the head of a large department, senator, academic of the Imperial Academy of Sciences. Occasionally, the rank was awarded to the long-time province governors to recognize their merits before their transfer to the capital. In addition to St. Petersburg, Privy Councillors could serve in Moscow and other large cities of the Russian Empire, for example in Tbilisi. The rector of Moscow State University, well-known historians Sergey Solovyov and Vasily Klyuchevsky, Professor of the Moscow Theological Academy Nicolay Subbotin were Privy Councilors. In 1903, there were 553 Privy Councilors in Russia.

The rank was abolished in 1917 by the Soviet decree on estates and civil ranks.

See also
Supreme Privy Council of Imperial Russia, founded on 19 February 1726
Geheimrat, a similar title in Germany
Privy council

References

Titles in Russia
 
Civil ranks of the Russian Empire